Khadoor Sahib Assembly constituency is a Punjab Legislative Assembly constituency in Tarn Taran district, Punjab state, India.

Members of the Legislative Assembly

Election results

2022

2017

References

External links
  

Assembly constituencies of Punjab, India
Tarn Taran district